Bellevue Medical Center is a hospital located in Bellevue, Sarpy County, Nebraska, United States.  It opened on May 17, 2010.

Services
The hospital provides immediate and primary care clinics, a pharmacy, indoor pool for therapy and rehabilitation services, infusion therapy, an emergency department, diagnostic center, and surgical center.

Located on the hospital's fourth flour, the Madonna Rehabilitation Specialty Hospital is a 32-bed center that treats patients of nineteen years of age or older who are afflicted with complex medical conditions, which was set to open on April 1, 2015.

References 

Hospitals in Nebraska